= Kevin Neils Tetz =

American television personality

Kevin Tetz
- Occupation: Certified auto-body repair man

Kevin Tetz is a Certified auto-body repair man, featured in a number of automotive television programs in the United States, as well as having his own line of instructional auto-body repair videos. Kevin Tetz is from British Columbia, Canada.

Tetz's instructional videos are notable in that they are among the very few instructional courses commonly available on the internet covering most auto-body related topics, from beginner to moderate techniques including rust repair, dent repair and painting.

Tetz has been a freelance automotive journalist since 2002, working for such automotive magazines & publications as Mustang & Fords, Mustang Monthly, Southern Rodder, Northern Rodder, Ford Performance Trucks and several online websites & blogs.

Tetz was a co-host of the weekly TRUCKS! series when it aired weekly on the Spike Network, which features custom and performance modifications to new and vintage trucks. It has since been changed by RTM Productions as the name changed from Power Block TV to the Power Nation. As a part of this change, it is now known as "Truck Tech" which airs on Spike TV, NBC Sports Nation and the CBS Sports Network. He is no longer with RTM Productions and has since left the show. He is now with the Eastwood Company and has an online podcast blog known as Shop Talk and Kevin's Korner.
